Ohland Bay or Baie Ohland Bay is a bay in northwestern New Caledonia. It lies northwest of Gomen Bay and just southeast of Nehoue Bay. The village of Paagoumene lies on the bay.

References

Bays of New Caledonia